The Bridgettines, or Birgittines, formally known as the Order of the Most Holy Savior (abbreviated OSsS), is a monastic religious order of the Catholic Church founded by Saint Birgitta (Bridget of Sweden) in 1344 and approved by Pope Urban V in 1370.  They follow the Rule of Saint Augustine. There are today several different branches of Bridgettines.

History
The first monastery of the order was founded in 1369 at the former royal castle of Vadstena. St. Bridget's granddaughter, Lady Ingegerd Knutsdotter, was Abbess of Vadstena from 1385 to 1403. Upon her death on 14 September 1412, direct descent from St. Bridget became extinct. This opened the medieval concept of "Bridget's spiritual children", members of the order founded by her, to be her true heirs.

The order spread widely in Sweden and Norway, and played a remarkable part in promoting culture and literature in Scandinavia; to this is to be attributed the fact that the motherhouse at Vadstena, by Lake Vättern, was not suppressed till 1595 even though the Protestant Reformation had been widespread in Scandinavia. By 1515, with significant royal patronage, there were 27 houses, 13 of them in Scandinavia. Bridgettine houses soon spread into other lands, reaching an eventual total of 80.

In England, the Bridgettine monastery of Syon Abbey at Isleworth, Middlesex, was founded and royally endowed by King Henry V in 1415, and became one of the richest, most fashionable, and influential religious communities in the country until its Dissolution under King Henry VIII. Elizabeth Sander was imprisoned on a mission in England and one of the monks of the community, Richard Reynolds, O.Ss.S., was among the first members of the English clergy to be executed as traitors for his refusal to accept the Oath of Supremacy. He was canonized as a martyr by Pope Paul VI in 1970.

Syon Abbey was among the few religious houses restored during Queen Mary I’s reign (1553–1558), when nearly twenty members of the old community were re-established there in 1557. Upon the accession of Queen Elizabeth I and the ensuing conflict between Catholics and the English Crown, the Bridgettine monastic community left England, first for the Low Countries, then, after many vicissitudes, to Rouen in France, and finally, in 1594, to Lisbon. The community remained in Lisbon (where the last monk of the community died), recruiting new members from England, until 1861, when they returned to England.

Syon Abbey in Devon continued as the only English religious community that had existed without interruption since pre-Reformation times. In 2004 the surviving medieval books of the monastic library were entrusted for safekeeping to the University of Exeter. Among the texts preserved was the Showing of Love by Julian of Norwich and The Orcherd of Syon, which translated Catherine of Siena's Dialogue. Syon Abbey's Tudor Gatepost in marble, on which parts of St Richard Reynolds' body were placed, was brought by the nuns into their exile, and then returned with them to England. This was later given to the Church of the Blessed Sacrament in Exeter.

Virtually all the Northern European Bridgettine monasteries (the bulk of the order) were destroyed during the Reformation.

Currently active branches
As of 2013 there were 800 members. The distinctive part of the Bridgetine veil for the professed sisters is the crown, called the "Crown of the Five Holy Wounds". It has five red marks, one at each joint, to remember the Five Wounds of Christ on the Cross. The monks wear a red cross with the image of an Eucharistic host at the center on the right breast of their cloak. The order has its own proper Rite for the Canonical Hours, called the Office of Our Lady. Most houses of the order support themselves by providing bed and breakfast hospitality to guests at standard industry rates.

Medieval branch
The original medieval branch today consists of four independent monasteries:

  Maria Refugie Abbey in Uden, Netherlands
 Syon Abbey in Isleworth, England (abandoned in 2011) 
   Birgittakloster in Altomünster Germany (abandoned in 2017)
 Pax Mariae Abbey in Vadstena, Sweden

Spanish branch
Marina de Escobar founded a Spanish branch in the 1630s, consisting only of nuns, following a slightly modified version of the St Bridget's Rule. It currently consists of four independent monasteries in Spain, four in Mexico and one in Venezuela.

Swedish branch
The largest branch of the Bridgettines today is the one founded by Saint Elizabeth Hesselblad, a nurse, on 8 September 1911 of religious sisters dedicated to providing hospitality for those in need of rest. It was fully approved by the Holy See on 7 July 1940, and currently consists of convents in Europe, Asia and North America.

The motherhouse of the order is located on the Piazza Farnese, close to the Campo de' Fiori, Rome, Italy, the house where Birgitta had once lived (see Santa Brigida in Rome).  On 28 October 2016, Fabia Kattakayam was selected as the order's new Abbess General.  She is the first person of Indian descent to serve in this position. As in all their houses, this convent offers accommodation. Protestant services also are held in the crypt, as the sisters have ecumenical outreach as part of their charism. After the Reformation a printshop was set up to print Swedish-language Catholic works.

Controversy arose in 2002 over the treatment of the Indian sisters who form a large percentage of the order. This became public in 2002 when six Indian sisters from different houses of the order in Italy fled and approached a Benedictine abbot in Subiaco. At the abbot's request, Bishop Silvio Cesare Bonicelli of Parma issued a special decree, letting the fugitive sisters enter a monastery of Benedictine nuns. The abbot, was subsequently forced to resign from office by the Holy See for this, a highly unusual act.

UK branch
Iver Heath, in Buckinghamshire, was the first foundation of the new branch of the Bridgettine Order in the UK and has been a house of prayer and provided hospitality since 1931. In 1999 Bridgettine sisters took up residence in a newly built convent at the Maryvale Institute in Birmingham.

St Bridget's Rule

The original Bridgettine Order was open to both men and women, and was dedicated to devotion to the Passion of Jesus Christ. It was a “double order” each monastery having attached to it a small community of monks to act as chaplains, but under the government of the abbess.

St Bridget's Rule stipulated: 

The nuns were strictly enclosed, emphasizing scholarship and study, but the monks were also preachers and itinerant missionaries. The individual monasteries were each subject to the local bishop, and, in honor of the Virgin Mary, they were ruled by an abbess.

Brigittine monks

The Brigittine monks are located in Amity, Oregon, at the Monastery of Our Lady of Consolation.  Founded on 16 March 1976, by Brother Benedict Kirby, O.Ss.S., it is the only Brigittine monastery of men in the world and the first since the nineteenth century when they were dispersed, largely due to the European wars. The monks here do not ordinarily receive Holy Orders, following the original pattern of monasticism.  The monastery has the canonical status of a priory sui juris (one which is autonomous) and is supported mainly through sales of their chocolate fudges and truffles.

Anglican Brigittines
The Most Holy Saviour Fraternity was founded in Mexico on 14 September 2012, and was confirmed by the bishop of the Anglican Diocese of the West, Mexico on 26 August 2013, in the city of San Luis Potosí.

See also

Katerina Lemmel
Mother Tekla Famiglietti
Societas Sanctae Birgittae
Pirita convent

References

External links

 Bridgettines of Rome, Italy
 Bridgettines of Vadstena, Sweden
 Bridgettines of Tallinn, Estonia
 Bridgettines of Amity, Oregon, USA 
 

 
1350 establishments in Europe
Christian religious orders established in the 14th century
Double monasteries
Augustinian monks
Augustinian nuns
Bridgettine Order